A kampong is a village in Brunei, Indonesia, Malaysia or Singapore, and a port in Cambodia.

Kampong may also refer to:

Places

 Cambodia
 Kampong Cham Province, province in Eastern Cambodia, bisected by the Mekong River
 Kampong Chhnang Province, also known as "Port of Pottery", province in Central Cambodia
 Kampong Speu Province, province in southwestern Cambodia
 Kampong Thom Province, province on the banks of the Stung Saen River in northwestern Cambodia, bordering the Tonie Sap
Kampong Thom (city), provincial capital of Kampong Thom Province, sometimes referred to as Kampong
 Kampong Som, another name for Sihanoukville

 Singapore
 Kampong Glam, a neighbourhood in Singapore

 United States
 The Kampong, a large tropical garden in Miami, Florida

 Australia
 Kampong, another name for the northern settlement area on Christmas Island, Flying Fish Cove

 Sri Lanka
 Kampong Kertel, another name for Slave Island, Colombo
 Kampung Pangeran, a local name for an area in Hultsdorf, Colombo
 Kampung Katukelle, another name for Katukele, Kandy
 Kampong Pensen, an area in Kandy, Sri Lanka

Other uses
 Kampong (field hockey club), a Dutch field hockey club in Utrecht
 Kampong, common name for Oroxylum indicum, a tree native to South-East Asia